Leucopis bellula is a species of fly in the family Chamaemyiidae.

References

Chamaemyiidae
Articles created by Qbugbot
Taxa named by Samuel Wendell Williston
Insects described in 1889